Giovanni Stefano Doria (Genoa, 1578 - Genoa, 1643) was the 101st Doge of the Republic of Genoa.

Career 
On July 5, 1633, the Grand Council chose Giovanni Stefano Doria to lead the highest office in the state, the fifty-sixth in two-year succession and the one hundred and first in republican history. Despite the peace negotiations with the Duchy of Savoy, and consequently with the Spanish Empire, initiated by his predecessor Leonardo Della Torre, the Doria's two-year period focused on new economic-financial alliances with the Kingdom of France and in particular with the Prime Minister and Cardinal Richelieu. After the mandate ended on July 5, 1635, it is assumed that he continued to serve the state in various official positions. Doria died in Genoa in 1643.

See also 

 Republic of Genoa
 Doge of Genoa
 Doria (family)

References 

17th-century Doges of Genoa
1578 births
1643 deaths